Sempacherlied is the title of a number of patriotic songs celebrating the Swiss victory at the Battle of Sempach (1386).

The oldest versions are recorded in the late 15th to early 16th century, e.g. by Melchior Russ (1488), by Wernher Schodeler (1515) and by Aegidius Tschudi (1536). A version composed by one   Hensli Halbsuter in the late 15th century, comprising a total of 63 verses, was printed in 1599 (incipit Im 1386 iar).

The modern song  (incipit Lasst hören aus alter Zeit) was written ca. 1836 by Heinrich Bosshard (1811-1877), set to music by Ulrich Wehrli (1794-1839), in the context of the period of Regeneration, formative of the Swiss national identity which resulted in the foundation of  Switzerland as a federal state in 1848.

See also
Beresinalied
Winkelried

References
Kreis, K. Das Sempacherlied mit den Lebensbildern des Componisten I.U. Wehrli und des Dichters H. Bosshard. Zürich, Zürcherische Liederbuchanstalt, 1886. 
Alois Lütolf, Luzerner Schlachtliederdichter im 15. Jahrh., bes. Hans Halbsuter und das Sempacherlied, Geschichtsfreund, 1862.
Ludwig Tobler, Schweizerische Volkslieder; mit Einleitung und Anmerkungen 1882.
Halbsuter, Hans, Lied von der Schlacht beschehen vor Sempach, in Lucerner Biet gelegen, Zürich, Rudolff Wyssenbach, 1599.

External links
Text of the Halbsuterlied

Swiss patriotic songs
Sempach